Cynthia Jean Wyels is an American mathematician whose interests include linear algebra, combinatorics, and mathematics education, and who is known for her research in graph pebbling and radio coloring of graphs. She is a professor of mathematics at California State University Channel Islands (CSUCI) in Camarillo, California, where she also co-directs the Alliance for Minority Participation.

Education and Career 
Wyels did her undergraduate studies at Pomona College, and earned a master's degree from the University of Michigan.
She completed her Ph.D. in mathematics from the University of California, Santa Barbara in 1994; her dissertation, Isomorphism Problems In A Matrix Setting, was supervised by Morris Newman.
She has taught mathematics at Weber State University and the United States Military Academy, and was chair of mathematics at California Lutheran University before moving to CSUCI.

Awards 
In 2012, Wyels was a winner of the Deborah and Franklin Haimo Awards for Distinguished College or University Teaching of Mathematics, given by the Mathematical Association of America to recognize teaching excellence that extends beyond a single institution. Her award citation particularly recognized her mentorship of Mexican and first-generation college students through the Research Experiences for Undergraduates program and through personal donations to education in Mexico, and her foundation of a mentorship program at CSUCI. In 2017, the Society for the Advancement of Chicanos/Hispanics and Native Americans in Science gave Wyels their distinguished mentor award. She received the CSUCI UndocuAlly of the Year award in 2017-18.

References

Year of birth missing (living people)
Living people
20th-century American mathematicians
Women mathematicians
Graph theorists
Pomona College alumni
University of Michigan alumni
University of California, Santa Barbara alumni
Weber State University faculty
United States Military Academy faculty
California Lutheran University faculty
California State University Channel Islands faculty
21st-century American mathematicians